Gilcrease Museum, also known as the Thomas Gilcrease Institute of American History and Art, is a museum northwest of downtown Tulsa, Oklahoma housing the world's largest, most comprehensive collection of art of the American West, as well as a growing collection of art and artifacts from Central and South America.  The museum is named for Thomas Gilcrease, an oil man and avid art collector, who began the collection. He deeded the collection, as well as the building and property, to the City of Tulsa in 1958. Since July 1, 2008, Gilcrease Museum  has been managed by a public-private partnership of the City of Tulsa and the University of Tulsa. The Helmerich  Center for American Research at Gilcrease Museum was added in 2014 at a cost of $14 million to provide a secure archival area where researchers can access any of the more than 100,000 books, documents, maps and unpublished materials that have been acquired by the museum.

History

Thomas Gilcrease grew up in the Muscogee (Creek) Nation, in present-day eastern Oklahoma. At the turn of the 20th century the federal government allotted lands collectively held by American Indian tribes to private citizens. His tribal membership entitled him to an allotment of  located just south of Tulsa. The land subsequently became part of one of Oklahoma's first major oil fields, the Glenn Pool Oil Reserve where the town of Glenpool was later established. Gilcrease proved to be an able businessman. In 1922, he founded the Gilcrease Oil Company, and in less than ten years had greatly expanded his original holdings. Thomas Gilcrease traveled extensively in Europe during the 1920s and 1930s. His visits to European museums inspired him to create his own collection. Pride in his American Indian heritage and interest in the history of the American West provided a focus for his collecting.

Gilcrease purchased his first oil painting titled Rural Courtship by Daniel Ridgway Knight in 1912 for $1,500, but most of the collection was amassed after 1939. The first Gilcrease Museum opened at his oil company headquarters (at that time located in San Antonio, Texas) in 1943. Within a few years, he returned to Tulsa with his oil company and his growing collection. He opened a gallery for public viewing on his Tulsa estate in 1949.

Gilcrease collected at a time when few people were interested in the art or history of the American West, and so his collection grew rapidly. During the early 1950s, he acquired numerous works of art, artifacts, and documents. Declining oil prices made it difficult for him to finance major purchases. Faced with a seemingly insurmountable debt, Gilcrease offered to sell his entire collection in order to keep it intact. In 1954, fearing that Gilcrease Museum would leave Tulsa, a small group of citizens organized a bond election. The voters of Tulsa approved, by a 3-to-1 margin, the bond issue that paid Gilcrease's outstanding debts. This kept the collection in the city.

Thomas Gilcrease then deeded his collection to the city of Tulsa in 1955. In 1958, the Gilcrease Foundation conveyed the museum buildings and grounds to the city of Tulsa. In addition, Gilcrease committed oil property revenue to Tulsa for assistance in maintaining the museum until the $2.25 million bond was fully repaid. In the years following the transfer of the collection, Thomas Gilcrease continued to fund archaeological excavations and acquire additional materials for the collection. Upon his death in 1962, he bequeathed to the museum the material he had collected during his final years.

Many famous American artists have their work displayed in Gilcrease Museum's American West Gallery. Albert Bierstadt, Frederic Remington, Thomas Moran, and Joseph Henry Sharp are featured prominently. Also on display at the Gilcrease Museum are works by Charles Marion Russell, Alexandre Hogue, and John James Audubon.  After his death in 1955, the widow of artist William Robinson Leigh gave his New York studio to the Gilcrease Museum.

Thomas Gilcrease believed that the story of the American West could be told through art and that the history of the Native Americans and his own American Indian heritage could be expressed through painting, sculpture, and other forms of art. He was a patron to a number of Native American artists of his time and purchased more than 500 paintings by 20th-century Native American artists alone.

Gilcrease Museum has a long-term native American exhibition. Enduring Spirit: Native American Artistic Traditions permits the museum to showcase some of the major strengths of the permanent collection as well as provide a much more comprehensive and integrated presentation of the museum's native American art collections.

Currently, the museum owns about 10,000 pieces of art, including 18 of the 22 bronze sculptures that were created by Frederic Remington.

On July 1, 2008, the University of Tulsa assumed management of the museum through a public-private partnership with the City of Tulsa.

Anthropology
At Gilcrease Museum, the anthropology collections and the work of the department of anthropology focus on the cultural history of North, Central, and South America. The collections comprise 300,000 artifacts, covering prehistoric and historic archaeology and ethnographic materials from Native American, Hispanic, pre-Columbian, and Anglo-American cultural traditions. The ethnographic and historical materials span the period from European exploration of the Americas to the current day.

These diverse materials help tell the story of the many peoples and cultures that have made the history and exploration of the new world unique and complex. Especially noteworthy in the archaeological collections at Gilcrease Museum are items from the Mississippi valley region (present-day Illinois and Arkansas), the southwestern U.S. (Colorado, New Mexico, and Arizona), and ancient Mexico. Gilcrease Museum has one of the most important collections of pre-Columbian projectile points (arrow and spear heads) in North America, and has become a resource that is regularly consulted by archaeologists.  The museum also has a research facility containing sliding glass display shelves for artifacts and a computer database system to help find various pieces. This facility, the Kravis Discovery Center, also has numerous "touchable" items for a hands-on experience for its visitors.

Archival collection

The archival collection at Gilcrease Museum contains over 100,000 books, manuscripts, documents, and maps ranging from 1494 to the present. Items of special interest are: A letter dictated and signed by Diego Columbus in 1512, the Cortez Decree of 1521, copies of the Declaration of Independence and the Articles of Confederation (signed by Benjamin Franklin), and a letter written by Thomas Jefferson dated July 1, 1776. The museum also has a substantial collection of manuscripts by Cherokee principal chief John Ross and Choctaw Chief Peter Pitchlynn.

Helmerich Center
The Helmerich Center for American Research at Gilcrease Museum is an archival center on the museum grounds that permits researchers to access the many rare documents housed at the museum. These items may only be used in the Reading Room, an environmentally controlled, secure area, designed to protect them against loss or damage. The documents themselves are stored in a hardened concrete structure that was designed to protect them from severe weather events like tornadoes. The secured connector passage between the Reading Room and the document storage area was inspired by the "Vasari Corridor" in Florence, Italy. The same structure that contains the Reading Room also contains the Great Hall, which is used for many purposes, such as fund raising events, conferences, and short-term gallery displays. The center was designed by Hastings & Chivetta, completed in 2014, contains  of space and cost approximately $14 million to construct.

Gilcrease gardens

Using the Gilcrease collections as a guide, themed gardens have been developed on twenty-three of the museum's . These gardens enhance the museum's collections by reflecting gardening styles and techniques from four time periods in the American West: Pre-Columbian, Pioneer, Colonial, Victorian, as well as a rock garden.

Gilcrease is the only known art museum to have these educational and inspirational gardens on one site nestled in the Osage Hills. Special garden tours are available by appointment.

Rebuilding

Voters approved an 0.6 percent sales tax (known as Vision 2025) on April 5, 2016, which proposed to allocate $65 million for a major expansion/improvement program of Gilcrease Museum.  However, the project morphed into an $83.6 million plan to build an entirely new museum after it was determined that modifying the existing museum to modern standards would be too expensive.  Demolition of the old building and the start of the new is expected to begin in 2022, with completion projected by early 2025.  The Helmerich Center, as well as the Thomas Gilcrease house and the mausoleum on the property, will remain.

See also
 George Catlin
 Thomas Gilcrease
 James Pepper Henry

Notes

References

External links

 Gilcrease Museum Website
 Gilcrease Museum info, photos and video on TravelOK.com Official travel and tourism website for the State of Oklahoma
 Encyclopedia of Oklahoma History and Culture - Gilcrease Museum
 Karp, Walter, "Thomas Gilcrease And His Western Museum", American Heritage, February 1990. "How Creek Indian number 1501 repaid a debt."
 Voices of Oklahoma interview. First person interview conducted on July 11, 2017, with grandson and great-grandsons of Thomas Gilcrease.

Art museums and galleries in Oklahoma
Natural history of Oklahoma
Museums of American art
Museums in Tulsa, Oklahoma
American West museums in Oklahoma
Archaeological museums in Oklahoma
Natural history museums in Oklahoma
Native American museums in Oklahoma
Native Americans in Tulsa, Oklahoma
Art museums established in 1943
1943 establishments in Oklahoma